Wang Muang is a district (amphoe) in the northern part of Saraburi province, central Thailand.

History
The district was created as a minor district (king amphoe) on 1 April 1990, with three tambons taken from Muak Lek district. It was upgraded to full district status on 7 September 1995.

Geography
Neighboring districts are (from the north clockwise) Phatthana Nikhom of Lopburi province and Muak Lek and Kaeng Khoi of Saraburi Province.

Administration
The district is divided into three sub-districts (tambons), which are further subdivided into 31 villages (mubans). Wang Muang is the only township (thesaban tambon), covering parts of tambons Wang Muang and Kham Phran. There are three tambon administrative organizations (TAO).

References

External links
amphoe.com

Wang Muang